The 2016–17 BSC Young Boys season was the club's 118th season in existence and their 13th season in the Swiss Super League.

Competitions

Swiss Super League

League table

Results summary

Results by matchday

UEFA Europa League

Group stage

Matches

Sources and References 

Young Boys
BSC Young Boys seasons